Frithjof Andersen (5 April 1893 – 24 July 1975) is a Norwegian wrestler and Olympic medalist in Greco-Roman wrestling, from Oslo.

Andersen competed at the 1920 Summer Olympics in Antwerp where he received a bronze medal in Greco-Roman wrestling, the lightweight class.

References

External links

1893 births
1975 deaths
Olympic wrestlers of Norway
Wrestlers at the 1920 Summer Olympics
Norwegian male sport wrestlers
Olympic bronze medalists for Norway
Olympic medalists in wrestling
Medalists at the 1920 Summer Olympics
Sportspeople from Oslo
19th-century Norwegian people
20th-century Norwegian people